Is is the third studio album by Chick Corea, released in 1969 on Solid State Records. It features Corea with trumpeter Woody Shaw, tenor saxophonist Bennie Maupin, flautist Hubert Laws, bassist Dave Holland and drummers Jack DeJohnette & Horace Arnold. In 2002, Blue Note Records re-released all tracks from this album, together with 1969's Sundance, along with alternate takes from both albums as The Complete "Is" Sessions.

Track listing 
All music composed by Chick Corea, except where otherwise noted.

Side one
"Is" – 28:54

Side two
"Jamala" – 14:04 (Dave Holland)
"This" – 8:18
"It" – 0:30

Personnel
 Chick Corea – piano, electric piano
 Woody Shaw – trumpet
 Bennie Maupin – tenor saxophone
 Hubert Laws – flute, piccolo flute
 Dave Holland – double bass
 Jack DeJohnette – drums
 Horace Arnold – drums

See also 
 The Complete "Is" Sessions (Blue Note, 2002)

References

External links 
 Chick Corea - Is (1969) album at JazzDisco.org
 Chick Corea - Is (1969) album review by Scott Yanow, credits & releases at AllMusic
 Chick Corea - Is (1969) album releases & credits at Discogs
 Chick Corea - The Complete "Is" Sessions (rec. 1969, rel. 2002) album releases & credits at Discogs
 Chick Corea - The Complete "Is" Sessions (rec. 1969, rel. 2002) album to be listened as stream on Spotify

1969 albums
Chick Corea albums
Solid State Records (jazz label) albums